Perittia tectusella is a moth in the family Elachistidae. It was described by Sruoga in 1997. It is found in Central Asia, where it has been recorded from Tajikistan.

The wingspan is 6.1-7.7 mm.

The larvae feed on Lonirica korolkowii. They mine the leaves of their host plant.

References

Moths described in 1997
Elachistidae
Moths of Asia